Johannes Lodewikus 'Moaner' van Heerden (born 18 July 1951) is a former South African rugby union international player.
He played as a lock.

His son, Wikus van Heerden, is also a South African international who played for Saracens in the Guinness Premiership before retiring in 2012.

Playing career
Van Heerden made his debut in senior provincial rugby for Northern Transvaal in 1972. In 1974 he played his first test match for Springboks next to Johan de Bruyn, a fellow lock debutant, in the third test against the touring Lions team of Willie John McBride at the Boet Erasmus Stadium in Port Elizabeth.From 1974 to 1980, van Heerden appeared in 17 test matches and scored one try. He also played in six tour matches for the Springboks.

Test history

See also
List of South Africa national rugby union players – Springbok no. 474

References

Further reading

Career information

1951 births
Living people
Rugby union players from Pretoria
Afrikaner people
South African people of Dutch descent
South African rugby union players
South Africa international rugby union players
Blue Bulls players
Rugby union locks